Perigea pectinata is a moth of the family Noctuidae. The species was first described by Gottlieb August Wilhelm Herrich-Schäffer in 1868. It is found on Cuba and the Dominican Republic.

References

Moths described in 1868
Condicinae